is a 1953 black-and-white Japanese film directed by Mizuho Shunkai.

Cast
 Hibari Misora

References

Japanese black-and-white films
1953 films
Films directed by Mizuho Shunkai
Shochiku films
1950s Japanese films